Toliara (also known as Toliary, ; formerly  Tuléar) is a city in Madagascar.

It is the capital of the Atsimo-Andrefana region, located 936 km southwest of national capital Antananarivo.

The current spelling of the name was adopted in the 1970s, reflecting the orthography of the Malagasy language. Many geographic place names, assigned French spellings during the colonial period, were altered following Malagasy independence in 1960.

The city has a population of 168,758 in 2018. As a port town it acts as a major import/export hub for commodities such as sisal, soap, hemp, cotton, rice and peanuts.

History 
In the 17th century, French buccaneers landed in the bay of St. Augustine near the Tropic of Capricorn, and founded the city to maintain commercial relations.  
It was not until the colonial period, after 1897, when the city really grew: with the efforts of Joseph Gallieni to install French administrative services, previously isolated on the island of Nosy Ve, to form the regional capital. Tulear grew along a grid pattern of cross streets, with wide avenues and public monuments.

Population 
Toliara has seen a population boom over the last two decades, due to a rural exodus that has brought over 200,000 citizens into urban centers in the region.

The Vezo, nomadic fishermen, are the indigenous ethnic group.  Today they are being dominated by migrants from the South (Mahafale, Masikoro, Antandroy) which make up more than half of the urban population. To these are added migrants from other urban regions, occupying positions in government and the private sector.

Religion 
Toliara's cathedral is the archiepiscopal seat of the Roman Catholic Archdiocese of Toliara, one of five in the country, originally the Diocese of Tuléar since 1957, renamed with the city in 1989, promoted in 2003 to Metropolitan archbishopric.

Culture and sights 

Regional cultural highlights include:
 The Ifaty beach near Tulear is famous for its water and sands.
 The Museum of Arts and Traditions of the South of Madagascar (in Cedratom) presents the life, crafts and funerary art of the people in the area.
 The Regional Museum of the University of Toliara: this museum has a small ethnological collection and a huge egg of Aepyornis.
 The Museum of the Sea,  founded by Professor Rabesandratana, is hosted by the Oceanographic Institute and covers the local aquatic flora and fauna, including a coelacanth caught in 1995 near Anakao.
 The Antsokay Arboretum: Established in 1980 at the initiative of the Swiss amateur botanist Petignat Hermann (1923-2000).  This arboretum covers an area of 52 hectares, with more than 920 plant species, lemurs, radiated tortoises, snakes and chameleons.
 A locally known shell market, on the waterfront, behind the French Alliance, sells shells and various handicraft products.

Education 
The University of Toliara is historically the oldest center for higher education, founded in 1971 after the decentralization of the University of Madagascar center. The university campus is located in Maninday 5 km east of the city, and teaches Humanities and Social Science, Science, Philosophy, and Management.

The Fisheries and Marine Sciences Institute (IHSM) welcomes students from diverse backgrounds, and offers advanced training in fisheries, aquaculture, and the marine and coastal environment. 

Toliara has a Technical School and two grammar schools (Lycée Laurent Botokeky and Antaninarenina High School), private and religious schools such as Sacred Heart College, Tsianaloke Mahavatse, and the School of Notre Dame, and a French international school, Collège Etienne de Flacourt, which serves école primaire (primary school) and collège.

Slogans 
 Fiherena no maha-Toliara "the (river) Fiherena is the soul of Toliara"
 Toliara tsy miroro "Toliara never sleeps"

Economy and production 
The port played a key role during the "boom corn" years in the 1980s and 90s. Today, the arrival of migrants contributing to agricultural production (maize, cassava and rice) and livestock (cattle and goats) supplying the city markets with food, has contributed to the development of small informal businesses: particularly among the Mahafale and Masikoro communities.  The city specializes in the import and export of various products including sisal, cotton, rice, peanuts and soap. Production of sea salt thrives, from salt marshes and landscaped places in coastal areas.

The Bay of Toliara houses one of Madagascar's oil exploration sites.
The sea floor is rich in minerals gemstones (about 200 km to the north lies the Ilakaka sapphire deposit has operated since 1999) and ground salt. 
More recently, Canadian companies begin operation of the ilmenite in the region of Tolanaro.
Beyond this mining and production, the industrial sector has declined in recent decades,

Tourism is a promising sector, thanks to the climate and natural assets of the hinterland (Ifaty Anakao, St Augustine).  Calm shallow seas and shallow support scuba diving, and Toliara remains a main destination for tours to southern Madagascar.

Geography and climate 
Toliara is located on a broad coastal plain, surrounded by dunes and mangroves, near the Tropic of Capricorn in the Mozambique Channel.  A nearby barrier reef  (the Great Reef) is 18 km long and 3 km wide. The beach area is extended by an underwater beach along the continental shelf that slopes gently seaward. To the north lies the Delta Fiherenana.

Toliara is nicknamed the "City of the Sun" because it has a hot climate (24.3 °C average) and is semi-arid (Köppen BSh), with less than 400 mm annual rainfall. The city is constantly swept by a strong prevailing wind, the Tsio Katimo ("South Wind").

Infrastructure 
The colonial legacy is still visible in the architecture and the urban landscape. Major road works and development were undertaken in 2003 to promote the development of the city.

The University Hospital Centre  CHU Mitsinjo Betanimena is located near the city center in the district of Tanambao. Another private health facility, St. Luke's Clinic, is located in the district of Sanfily on the road to the airport.

Transport 
There is an airport.
Air Madagascar operates scheduled flights to here.

See also 
 Isalo National Park
 Beza Mahafaly Reserve
 Coton de Tulear

References

External links 
 See Tulear on WikiMapia
 https://web.archive.org/web/20070929160859/http://www.fimfrance.com/_repository/files/2007-01_FS_exploration_petroliere.PDF

Cities in Madagascar
Populated places in Atsimo-Andrefana
Regional capitals in Madagascar
Populated coastal places in Madagascar
Mozambique Channel